The peony is a flowering plant.

Peony may also refer to:

 , the name of two Royal Navy ships
 , a Union Navy steamer acquired near the end of the American Civil War
 Peony (novel), by Pearl S. Buck
 Peony, one of nine chimpanzees used in a language experiment detailed in the book, The Mind of an Ape
 Peony Star (a name for WR 102ka from the Peony Nebula in which it is embedded), one of several candidates for the most luminous known star in the Milky Way
 Peony Nebula, whose name comes from its appearance